Norm Tomkinson (11 December 1917 – 18 July 2002) was an  Australian rules footballer who played with North Melbourne in the Victorian Football League (VFL).

Notes

External links 

1917 births
2002 deaths
Australian rules footballers from Victoria (Australia)
North Melbourne Football Club players